Traunkirchen is a municipality on the Traunsee in the Austrian state of Upper Austria, Austria.

Tourism
The lake and the mountains provide opportunities for outdoor activities like hiking, sailing, diving, skiing, swimming, and surfing. The village is known for the Fischerkanzel (Fisherman's Pulpit), located in the parish church, which was carved in 1753.

Population

References

Cities and towns in Gmunden District